List of hospitals in Ottawa.

General Care
Children's Hospital of Eastern Ontario (CHEO) (401 Smyth Road)
Montfort Hospital (713 Montreal Road)
National Defence Medical Centre (713 Montreal Road)
The Ottawa Hospital campuses: 
Riverside Hospital (1967 Riverside Drive)
General Hospital (501 Smyth Road)
Civic Hospital (1053 Carling Avenue)
Queensway Carleton Hospital (3045 Baseline Road)

Specialized Care
University of Ottawa Heart Institute (40 Ruskin Street)
Royal Ottawa Mental Health Centre (1145 Carling Avenue)
Élisabeth Bruyère Hospital (43 Bruyère Street)
St. Vincent Hospital (60 Cambridge Street North)
Perley & Rideau Veteran's Health Centre (1750 Russell Road)

Surrounding region

Ontario
 Almonte General Hospital (75 Spring Street)
 Arnprior Regional Health (350 John Street North)
 Carleton Place & District Memorial Hospital (211 Lake Avenue East)
 Perth & Smiths Falls District Hospitals
 Perth (33 Drummond Street West)
 Smiths Falls (60 Cornelia Street West)
 Kemptville District Hospital (2675 Concession Road)
 Winchester District Memorial Hospital (566 Louise Street)
 Amis Health Care Services Inc. - Senior Care (1730 St. Laurent Blvd)

Gatineau, Quebec
 Hôpital de Gatineau (909 Boulevard la Vérendrye Ouest)
 Hull Hospital (116 Boulevard Lionel-Émond)
 Hospital De Papineau (155 Rue Maclaren Est)
 Hôpital en santé mentale Pierre-Janet (20 Rue Pharand)

 
Ottawa
Ottawa
Hospitals
Hospitals in Ottawa